Bruce Hill (July 9, 1949 – May 14, 2017) was an American stock car racing driver from Topeka, Kansas. He competed in the Winston Cup Series, ARCA, and in the NASCAR West Series. He also competed in late model races around his hometown later in life.

Personal life
Hill was born on July 9, 1949 in Topeka, Kansas, and graduated from Shawnee Heights High School. He resided in and around the Topeka metropolitan area his later years of life, raising American Quarter Horses. Hill died on May 14, 2017 due to issues with esophageal cancer.

NASCAR career
In 1974, Hill began racing in NASCAR in the Winston Cup Series and the NASCAR West Series. He only competed in one race in both series the same year.  The race in 1974 was the only race Hill would run in the West series.

One year later, Hill won the Rookie of the Year award in the Winston Cup Series. During that season, he competed in all but four of the season's 30 races. Among his highlights were top-five finishes at Rockingham Motor Speedway, Darlington Raceway and Dover International Speedway.  Still running as an independent driver, Hill  returned to the series again in 1976, competing in 22 events, which he recorded only four top-ten finishes and finished 23rd in the standings. In 1977, Hill was able to record four top-tens and a 29th-place finish in points after participating in 16 events. During the following year, he only participated in 14 events, and recorded two top-tens with a 32nd-place finish in the point standings, but benefited form teaming up with Harry Clary to field cars. 

For 1979, Hill teamed up with fellow owner-driver Walter Ballard for a limited slate of events. He finished 34th in points after running seven races. Continuing to race for Ballard in 1980, he finished 50th in points, and only competed in six races. In his final year in the Winston Cup Series, he competed in eight races and finished 43rd in points. Also in 1981, he participated in a NASCAR Late Model Sportsman race at Darlington Raceway.

Other racing
While competing in the Winston Cup Series, he also participated in the ARCA Racing Series as well as in USAC. In 2002, Hill participated in a Late model race at Thunderhill Speedway in Mayetta, Kansas.

In 2016 it was announced that A.J. Allmendinger would run a throwback scheme based on Hill's 1977 car for the annual throwback race at Darlington Raceway.

References

External links 
 Bruce Hill statistics at Racing-Reference.info

1949 births
2017 deaths
NASCAR drivers
Racing drivers from Kansas
Sportspeople from Topeka, Kansas
Deaths from cancer in Kansas 
Deaths from esophageal cancer